John Adam Belushi (January 24, 1949 – March 5, 1982) was an American comedian, actor, and musician. He was one of the seven original cast members of the NBC sketch comedy show Saturday Night Live (SNL). Throughout his career, Belushi had a personal and artistic partnership with his fellow SNL star Dan Aykroyd, whom he met while they were both working at Chicago's Second City comedy club.

Born in Chicago to Albanian-American parents, Belushi started his own comedy troupe with Tino Insana and Steve Beshekas, called "The West Compass Trio". After being discovered by Bernard Sahlins, he performed with The Second City and met Aykroyd, Brian Doyle-Murray, and Harold Ramis. In 1975, Chevy Chase and Michael O'Donoghue recommended Belushi to SNL creator and showrunner Lorne Michaels, who accepted him as a new cast member of the show after an audition. Belushi developed a series of characters on the show that reached great success, including his performances as Henry Kissinger and Ludwig van Beethoven. After his breakout film role as Bluto in National Lampoon's Animal House (1978), Belushi appeared in films such as 1941, The Blues Brothers, and Neighbors. He also pursued interests in music: with Aykroyd, Lou Marini, Tom Malone, Steve Cropper, Donald "Duck" Dunn, and Paul Shaffer, he founded The Blues Brothers, which led to the film of the same name.

Belushi struggled with heavy drug abuse that threatened his comedy career; more than once, he was dismissed from SNL due to his behavior (and then rehired). In 1982, he died from combined drug intoxication, after a drug dealer, Cathy Smith, injected him with a mixture of heroin and cocaine known as a speedball at the Chateau Marmont hotel in West Hollywood, California. He was posthumously honored with a star on the Hollywood Walk of Fame in 2004.

Early life 

John Adam Belushi was born to Agnes Demetri ( Samaras) Belushi and Adam Anastos Belushi in Humboldt Park, a neighborhood on the West Side of Chicago, Illinois. Agnes, a pharmacy worker, was born in Ohio to Albanian immigrants from Korçë, while Adam was an Albanian immigrant from Qytezë, who owned the Fair Oaks restaurant on North Avenue in Chicago, and later established a restaurant in the Chicago suburb of Wheaton, Illinois.

Belushi was raised in Wheaton along with his three siblings - younger brothers Billy and Jim, and sister Marian. He was Eastern Orthodox Christian, attending the Albanian Orthodox Church. He was educated at Wheaton Central High School, where he met his future wife, Judith Jacklin.

In 1965, Belushi formed a band, the Ravens, together with four fellow high-school students (Dick Blasucci, Michael Blasucci, Tony Pavilonis, and Phil Special). They recorded one single, "Listen to Me Now/Jolly Green Giant". Belushi played drums and sang vocals. The record was not successful, and the band broke up when he enrolled at the College of DuPage. He also attended the University of Wisconsin–Whitewater for a year, which inspired the Animal House scene of D-Day driving a motorcycle up the stairs. Belushi acquired the iconic "College" crewneck, worn by his character in Animal House, at a print shop when visiting his brother Jim, who attended Southern Illinois University.

Career

The Second City and National Lampoon 
Belushi started his own comedy troupe in Chicago, the West Compass Trio (named after the improvisational cabaret revue Compass Players active from 1955 to 1958 in Chicago), with Tino Insana and Steve Beshekas. Their success piqued the interest of Bernard Sahlins, the founder of The Second City improvised comedy enterprise, who went to see them performing in 1971, and asked Belushi to join the cast. At Second City, Belushi met and began working with Harold Ramis, Joe Flaherty and Brian Doyle-Murray.

In 1972, Belushi was offered a role, together with Chevy Chase and Christopher Guest, in National Lampoon Lemmings, a parody of Woodstock, which played off-Broadway in 1972. Belushi and Jacklin moved to New York City. There, Belushi started working as a writer, director, and actor for The National Lampoon Radio Hour, a comedy radio show that was created, produced, and written by staff from National Lampoon magazine. Cast members on the shows produced by Belushi included Ramis, Flaherty, Guest, Brian Doyle Murray, his brother Bill Murray, Gilda Radner, and Richard Belzer. During a trip to Toronto to check out the local Second City cast in 1974, he met Dan Aykroyd. Jacklin became an associate producer for the show, and Belushi and she were married on December 31, 1976. "The National Lampoon Show" toured the country in 1974; it was produced by Ivan Reitman. Lampoon owner Matty Simmons was offered a TV show on NBC at this time, but declined the offer.

Saturday Night Live 
In 1975, Chase and writer Michael O'Donoghue recommended Belushi to Lorne Michaels as a potential member for a television show Michaels was about to produce for NBC called NBC's Saturday Night, later Saturday Night Live (SNL). Michaels was initially undecided, as he was not sure if Belushi's physical humor would fit with what he was envisioning, but he changed his mind after giving Belushi an audition.

Over his four-year tenure at SNL, Belushi developed a series of successful characters, including the belligerent Samurai Futaba; Henry Kissinger; Ludwig van Beethoven; the Greek owner (Pete Dionisopoulos) of the Olympia Café; Captain James T. Kirk; and a contributor of furious opinion pieces on Weekend Update, during which he coined his catchphrase, "But N-O-O-O-O-O-O-O-O-O!" With Aykroyd, Belushi created Jake and Elwood, the Blues Brothers. Originally intended to warm up the studio audience before broadcasts of SNL, the Blues Brothers were eventually featured as musical guests. Belushi also reprised his Lemmings imitation of Joe Cocker. Cocker himself joined Belushi in 1976 to sing "Feelin' Alright?" together.

Like many other SNL cast members and writers, Belushi began using drugs heavily and attended concerts with many of the popular artists of the era including Fleetwood Mac, Meat Loaf, KISS, The Dead Boys, Warren Zevon, The Grateful Dead, and The Allman Brothers. In 1990, Michaels remembered him as loyal to the writers and a team player, but he was fired and rehired at SNL more than once owing to behavior stemming from his drug abuse.

In Rolling Stones February 2015 appraisal of all 141 SNL cast members to that time, Belushi received the top ranking. "Belushi was the 'live' in Saturday Night Live", they wrote, "the one who made the show happen on the edge ... Nobody embodied the highs and lows of SNL like Belushi."

Cinema 
In 1978, Belushi performed in the films Old Boyfriends (directed by Joan Tewkesbury), Goin' South (directed by Jack Nicholson), and National Lampoon's Animal House (directed by John Landis). Upon its initial release, Animal House received generally mixed reviews from critics, but Time magazine and Roger Ebert proclaimed it one of the year's best movies. Filmed for $2.8 million, it is one of the most profitable movies of all time, garnering an estimated gross of more than $141 million in the form of theatrical rentals and home video, not including merchandising. Animal House, written by Doug Kenney, Harold Ramis, and Chris Miller, followed in the tradition of the Marx Brothers films that featured subversive and satirical plots that took on traditional institutions. Hollywood studios tried to copy the film's success without the satire, creating a string of "nerds vs. jocks" films in the 1980s with cheap sight gags involving nudity and gross-out humor. Stripes and Meatballs, starring Bill Murray, followed the formula, as well, and even included a motivational speech in the last act, a la Belushi's character Bluto. Ivan Reitman produced both, as well as Animal House.

Following the success of the Blues Brothers on SNL, Belushi and Aykroyd, with the help of pianist-arranger Paul Shaffer, started assembling studio talents to form a proper band. These included SNL saxophonist "Blue" Lou Marini and trombonist-saxophonist Tom Malone, who had previously played in Blood, Sweat & Tears. At Shaffer's suggestion, guitarist Steve Cropper and bassist Donald "Duck" Dunn, the powerhouse combo from Booker T and the M.G.'s, who played on dozens of hits from Memphis's Stax Records during the 1960s, were signed as well. In 1978, the Blues Brothers released their debut album, Briefcase Full of Blues, with Atlantic Records. The album reached No. 1 on the Billboard 200 and went double platinum. Two singles were released: "Rubber Biscuit", which reached number 37 on the Billboard Hot 100, and "Soul Man", which reached number 14.

In 1979, Belushi left SNL with Aykroyd to film The Blues Brothers, which conflicted with the shooting schedule of the show. Michaels also decided to leave at the end of his contract. NBC's pressure to use recurring characters was also a factor in their decision. Belushi and Aykroyd made two movies together after leaving: Neighbors (directed by John Avildsen), and most notably The Blues Brothers (directed by John Landis). Released in the U.S. on June 20, 1980, The Blues Brothers received generally positive reviews. It earned just under $5 million in its opening weekend, and went on to gross $115.2 million in theaters worldwide before its release on home video. The Blues Brothers band toured to promote the film, which led to a third album (and second live album), Made in America, recorded at the Universal Amphitheatre in 1980. The track "Who's Making Love" peaked at number 39.

The only film Belushi made without Aykroyd following his departure from SNL was the romantic comedy Continental Divide (directed by Michael Apted). Released in September 1981, it starred Belushi as Chicago hometown hero writer Ernie Souchack (loosely based on newspaper columnist and long-time family friend Mike Royko), who gets an assignment researching a scientist (played by Blair Brown) who studies birds of prey in the remote Rocky Mountains.

By 1981, Belushi had become a fan and advocate of the punk rock band Fear after seeing them perform in several after-hours New York City bars, and brought them to Cherokee Studios to record songs for the soundtrack of Neighbors. Blues Brothers band member Tom Scott, along with producing partner and Cherokee owner Bruce Robb, initially helped with the session, but later pulled out due to conflicts with Belushi. The session was eventually produced by Cropper. The producers of Neighbors refused to use the song in the movie. Belushi, along with O'Donoghue and SNL writer Nelson Lyon, booked Fear to play SNLs Halloween broadcast on October 31, 1981; the telecast of the performance featured then-novel moshing and stage diving, and was cut short by NBC due to the band's profanity. The New York Post published an account of these and other sensationalistic details of the event the following day.

At the time of his death, Belushi was pursuing several movie projects, including an ABSCAM-related caper called Moon Over Miami, to be directed by Louis Malle; and a diamond-smuggling caper called Noble Rot with Jay Sandrich, based on a script he adapted and rewrote with former SNL writer Don Novello. However, Paramount Studios offered to produce Noble Rot only if Belushi starred in The Joy of Sex, which would have featured him in a diaper. Aykroyd advised him to turn down The Joy of Sex and return to the East Coast, where Aykroyd was writing Ghostbusters. Belushi also talked about producing a drug trafficking film in a High Times tribute article from 1982: "Belushi wanted to give these daring captains courageous of consciousness the credit they deserved, he told me. He wanted to star in a major marijuana movie to be called Kingpin. He wanted to play the title role."

Belushi filmed a "guest-star appearance" on an episode of the television series Police Squad! (1982) by the creators of Airplane!. The opening of the show featured a running joke that featured a sight gag with the guest star dying right away. Belushi died shortly before the episode was to air, so the scene was cut and replaced by a segment with William Conrad.

Death 
Belushi had managed to refrain from drug use for a brief period during the production of Continental Divide, but severely relapsed during the production of Neighbors. Less than four months after the shoot ended, on March 4, 1982, Belushi visited the Los Angeles office of his long-time manager Bernie Brillstein and asked him for money. Brillstein declined, strongly suspecting that Belushi wanted money for drugs. Later that day, Belushi returned and again asked for money while Brillstein was in a meeting with someone. Brillstein was reluctant to rebuke Belushi in front of the other person and gave him the money. In the early morning hours of March 5, Belushi was visited separately by friends Robin Williams and Robert De Niro, as well as drug dealer Cathy Smith.

Around 12:00 pm PDT on Friday, March 5, 1982, Belushi's fitness trainer and occasional bodyguard Bill Wallace arrived at Belushi's bungalow at the Chateau Marmont hotel to deliver a typewriter and audiocassette recorder because Belushi had requested them the previous day. Wallace found Belushi dead, with no one else present in the bungalow. Neither law enforcement nor a representative of the coroner's office revealed any details for almost six days. On the morning of March 11, Los Angeles County coroner Thomas Noguchi announced that the cause of death was combined drug intoxication involving cocaine and heroin, a drug combination known as a speedball.

Belushi's death was eventually investigated by forensic pathologist Michael Baden, 

Cathy Smith was arrested by the Los Angeles Police Department (LAPD) on March 5, 1982, because she was under suspicion for possession of narcotics, not because of Belushi's death. Later in 1982, Rolling Stone magazine described the circumstances of her arrest as follows: "On the afternoon of March 5th, Cathy Evelyn Smith had appeared driving the wrong way into the one-way exit of the Chateau Marmont Hotel on Sunset Strip behind the wheel of John Belushi's rented red Mercedes. ... At that moment, a hundred feet away, Belushi lay naked and dead on the floor of his $200-a-day bungalow. The police who had cordoned off the area were reflexively insisting it had been 'death from natural causes. The LAPD released Smith after questioning. 

In an interview with the National Enquirer in May 1982, Smith admitted that she had been with Belushi at the Chateau Marmont on the night of his death and had given him the fatal speedball shot. After the appearance of the Enquirer article, the case was reopened. Smith was arrested, extradited from Canada, and charged with first-degree murder. Her case was delayed by lawyers' negotiations for four years while she remained free, then she was convicted and incarcerated. A plea bargain reduced the charge to involuntary manslaughter, and she served 15 months in prison.

In 1982, Belushi's widow Judith arranged for a traditional Orthodox Christian funeral that was conducted by an Albanian Orthodox priest. He was interred at Abel's Hill Cemetery in Chilmark, Massachusetts, on Martha's Vineyard. Belushi's tombstone has a skull and crossbones with the inscription, "I may be gone but Rock and Roll lives on." His body was removed and reburied in an unmarked grave nearby due to fans littering on his original grave. The tombstone of Belushi’s mother at Elmwood Cemetery in River Grove, Illinois, has Belushi's name inscribed on it and thus serves as a cenotaph.

Belushi was scheduled to present the first Best Visual Effects Oscar at the 1982 Academy Awards with Dan Aykroyd. Aykroyd presented the award alone, and stated from the lectern: "My partner, he would have loved to have been here tonight to present this award, since he was somewhat of a visual effect himself."

Tributes, legacy, and popular culture 

During the first live SNL episode following Belushi's death with host Robert Urich and musical guest Mink DeVille, airing live on March 20, 1982, cast member Brian Doyle-Murray gave a tribute to him. During the preproduction of Ghostbusters, Reitman remarked that Slimer bore a resemblance to Belushi's character Bluto from Animal House. Since then, Slimer has been described as "the ghost of John Belushi" by Aykroyd in many interviews.

Belushi's life was detailed in two books: the 1984 biography Wired: The Short Life and Fast Times of John Belushi by Bob Woodward, the accuracy of which has been questioned by journalists and by people close to Belushi, and the 1990 memoir Samurai Widow by his widow Judith. Woodward's book was adapted into a film of the same name in 1989, which was denounced by Aykroyd and Judith, and was given poor reviews by critics. Belushi's career and death were prominently featured in the 1999 memoir of his manager Bernie Brillstein, who wrote that he was haunted by the comedian's overdose and had since learned how to better deal with clients who abuse drugs or alcohol.

Eddie Money wrote "Passing by the Graveyard (Song for John B.)", from his 1982 album No Control, in tribute to Belushi. The two became friends after Money was a musical guest on SNL during the show's third season. The thrash metal group Anthrax penned a song about Belushi on their 1987 album Among the Living, titled "Efilnikufesin (N.F.L.)." Polish rock band Lady Pank recorded a song "John Belushi" for their 1988 album Tacy sami, with references to his Albanian ancestry.

Belushi has been portrayed by actors Eric Siegel in Gilda Radner: It's Always Something, Tyler Labine in Behind the Camera: The Unauthorized Story of Mork & Mindy (which also features his friendship with Robin Williams), Michael Chiklis in Wired, and John Gemberling in A Futile and Stupid Gesture. Chris Farley, who was heavily influenced by Belushi, died in 1997 at age 33 due to a drug overdose, which has fueled many comparisons between Belushi and Farley.

In 2004, Belushi was posthumously inducted into the Hollywood Walk of Fame with a motion pictures star located at 6355 Hollywood Boulevard. In 2006, Biography Channel aired an episode of Final 24, a documentary following Belushi during the last 24 hours leading to his death. Four years later, Biography aired a full biography documentation of Belushi's life. In 2015, Belushi was ranked by Rolling Stone as the greatest SNL cast member of all time.

Belushi's widow later remarried and is now Judith Jacklin Belushi Pisano. Co-biographer Tanner Colby and she produced Belushi: A Biography, a collection of first-person interviews and photographs of Belushi's life that was published in 2005.

According to SNL castmate Jane Curtin, who appeared on The Oprah Winfrey Show in 2011, Belushi was a misogynist who would deliberately sabotage the work of female writers and comics while working on the show: "So you'd go to a table read, and if a woman writer had written a piece for John, he would not read it in his full voice. He felt as though it was his duty to sabotage pieces written by women." SNL writer Anne Beatts suggested that because she was writing a book with his wife at the time, Belushi was frustrated with them spending more time on the book than with him. He complained to Michaels about Beatts and Rosie Shuster. Judith claims that Belushi was a "Women's Libber" and did not hate women.

Filmography

Film

Television

Others

Discography 
 Listen to Me Now/Jolly Green Giant (Alonas Dream Records, 1965) (with the Ravens)
 National Lampoon's Lemmings (Blue Thumb Records, 1973) (bass guitar, lead vocals on Lonely At The Bottom)
 Old Boyfriends: Original Soundtrack (Columbia, 1978) (lead vocals on Jailhouse Rock, You Belong to Me, Get Up and Down and Tush)
 National Lampoon's Animal House: Original Soundtrack (Universal, 1978) (lead vocals on Money (That's What I Want) and Louie Louie)
 Briefcase Full of Blues (Atlantic, 1978) US #1 (with the Blues Brothers)
 The Blues Brothers: Music from the Soundtrack (Atlantic, 1980) US #13 (with the Blues Brothers)
 Made in America (Atlantic, 1980) US #49 (with the Blues Brothers)
 Best of The Blues Brothers (Atlantic, 1981) US #143 (with the Blues Brothers)
 Dancin' wid da Blues Brothers (Atlantic, 1983) (with the Blues Brothers)
 Everybody Needs the Blues Brothers (Atlantic, 1988) (with the Blues Brothers)
 The Definitive Collection (Atlantic, 1992) (with the Blues Brothers)
 The Very Best of The Blues Brothers (Atlantic, 1995) (with the Blues Brothers)
 The Blues Brothers Complete (Atlantic, 2000) (with the Blues Brothers)
 The Essentials (Atlantic, 2003) (with the Blues Brothers)
 Neighbors (Fear Records, 2015) (with Fear)

Comedy albums 
 Official National Lampoon Stereo Test and Demonstration Record (National Lampoon, 1974)
 The Missing White House Tapes (National Lampoon, 1974)
 National Lampoon Gold Turkey (National Lampoon, 1975)
 NBC's Saturday Night Live (Arista, 1976)
 National Lampoon That's Not Funny, That's Sick (National Lampoon, 1977)
 Greatest Hits of the National Lampoon (National Lampoon, 1978)
 National Lampoon White Album (National Lampoon, 1979).

See also 

The Last Voyage of the Starship Enterprise
Olympia Café
List of deaths from drug overdose and intoxication
Belushi, a 2020 documentary about him

References

External links 

 
 
 

1949 births
1982 deaths
20th-century American comedians
20th-century American male actors
20th-century American musicians
20th-century American screenwriters
Accidental deaths in California
Actors from Wheaton, Illinois
American impressionists (entertainers)
American male comedians
American male film actors
American male television actors
American male television writers
American manslaughter victims
American people of Albanian descent
American sketch comedians
American television writers
Burials in Massachusetts
Cocaine-related deaths in California
College of DuPage alumni
Deaths by heroin overdose in California
Drug-related deaths in California
Eastern Orthodox Christians from the United States
Male actors from Chicago
Members of the Albanian Orthodox Church
Primetime Emmy Award winners
Screenwriters from Illinois
The Blues Brothers members
University of Wisconsin–Whitewater alumni